WBS may refer to:

Business
 Ward-Beck Systems, Canadian manufacturer of Audio and Video equipment
 Webster Bank (NYSE: WBS), a bank based out of Waterbury, Connecticut

Education
 Warwick Business School, the largest academic department of the University of Warwick
 Wesley Biblical Seminary, a multi-denominational graduate school of theology
 West Bridgford School, a technology college
 Westminster Business School, one of the two business schools of the University of Westminster
 Willy Brandt Schule (disambiguation) may refer to schools in and outside of Germany
 Willy-Brandt-Schule in Warsaw, Poland

Medicine
 Beckwith-Wiedemann syndrome, or Wiedemann Beckwith Syndrome, a genetic disorder 
 Williams-Beuren syndrome, a rare genetic disorder

Sports
 WBS Penguins, the American Hockey League affiliate of the NHL's Pittsburgh Penguin
 Williams-Brice Stadium, home of the South Carolina Gamecocks collegiate football team

Technology
 Wafer backside coating, a procedure used in the electronic industry, mostly as part of the electroless nickel plating process
 WebChat Broadcasting System, a virtual community

Others
 Wavah Broadcasting System (WBS), a Kampala, East Africa Television Station
 West by south (WbS), a compass point
 Work breakdown structure, a fundamental project management technique